The Barnstormer is a 1922 American silent comedy film directed by Charles Ray and written by Richard Andres and Edward Withers. The film stars Charles Ray, Wilfred Lucas, Florence Oberle, Lionel Belmore, Phil Dunham, Gus Leonard, Lincoln Plumer, Charlotte Pierce, George Nichols, and Blanche Rose. The film was released in January 1922 by Associated First National.

Plot
As described in a film magazine, Joel Matthews (Ray), a farmer's son, aspires to become an actor. A visiting acting troupe gives him his opportunity, and he becomes a porter, call boy, piano player, stage hand, and finally an actor with two lines. His model in all things is the Leading Man (Lucas), whose every move he imitates. In a small town he meets and falls in love with the Emily (Pierce), daughter of the druggist (Plumer). The play is in town for a week. While playing to a full house, the Leading Man, disguised as a burglar, holds up the audience and hides in his dressing room. Joel discovers him and the loot, and, when he forces the Leading Man to return the money, he wins both the plaudits of the townspeople and the hand of Emily.

Cast
Charles Ray as Joel 
Wilfred Lucas as Leading Man 
Florence Oberle as Leading Lady 
Lionel Belmore as Manager 
Phil Dunham as Stage Carpenter 
Gus Leonard as Theater Owner 
Lincoln Plumer as Druggist
Charlotte Pierce as Emily
George Nichols as Joel's father 
Blanche Rose as Joel's mother 
Bert Offord as the Nut

Preservation
The film is now considered lost.

Gallery

References

External links

1922 comedy films
1922 films
Silent American comedy films
American silent feature films
American black-and-white films
First National Pictures films
Lost American films
1922 lost films
Lost comedy films
Films directed by Charles Ray
1920s American films